Tirana 11 is one of the 24 administrative units in Tirana.

Neighborhoods
 Lapraka
 Instituti

References

Tirana 11